Sinú River, is a river in northwestern Colombia that flows mostly through the Córdoba Department and into the Caribbean. It is the third most important river in the Caribbean Region, after the Magdalena River and the Cauca River. It is born in the Antioquia Department, flowing south to north for  until flowing into the Caribbean Sea. The river is navigable for only half of its length,  starting in Montería, the largest city in its basin.  
Also, this river is the main tourist attraction of Montería decorated with the first avenue when it passes by Montería.

Ecology
The river flows through the Sinú Valley dry forests ecoregion.
In general, the aquatic fauna shows connections with the Magdalena–Cauca River basin, but also the Atrato River basin. There has been extensive habitat destruction in the region, causing problems to many species in the area. Two parrots that are endemic to the river valley, the Sinú brown-throated parakeet (Aratinga pertinax griseipecta) and the Sinú parakeet (Pyrrhura picta subandina), have not been recorded for decades and are feared extinct.

Urra Dam
The Urra Dam built by the company Urrá is on the Sinú River.

References

Rivers of Colombia